Emmons County Courthouse in Linton, North Dakota was built in 1934.  It is notable for being the first Works Progress Administration project granted in the state. Seven courthouses in the state were completed as part of this program.  The Emmons County Courthouse is also one of eight Art Deco courthouses in North Dakota.  The Courthouse was entered into the National Register of Historic Places on 14 November 1985.

References

Courthouses on the National Register of Historic Places in North Dakota
County courthouses in North Dakota
Government buildings completed in 1934
Art Deco architecture in North Dakota
Works Progress Administration in North Dakota
National Register of Historic Places in Emmons County, North Dakota
1934 establishments in North Dakota